Jordan Bay, Nova Scotia  is a community of the Municipality of the District of Shelburne in the Canadian province of Nova Scotia.  Formerly the  home of the MacAlpines.

References
 Jordan Bay on Destination Nova Scotia

Communities in Shelburne County, Nova Scotia
General Service Areas in Nova Scotia